Aert Mijtens (c.1541–1602) was a Flemish Renaissance painter.

Early life

Mitjens was born in Brussels. He was the first known member of a family of painters named Mijtens or Mytens. He was the uncle of Isaac Mijtens (ca. 1602–1666), a portrait painter in The Hague and Daniel Mijtens (ca. 1590-ca. 1647), a painter at the English court.

Career
According to the early biographer Karel van Mander he travelled to Rome where he was called Rinaldo fiammingo and became a friend of the painter Hans Speckaert. He painted in the studio of another Flemish painter there called Anthoni Santvoort, who painted representations of Mary (Maria Magior) on copper.

Mijtens was active in Brussels, Rome, Naples (where he was successful and worked for the court of the Viceroy), L'Aquila, and The Hague. He was a teacher of Barend van Someren during his Rome residency. Van Someren married Mijtens' daughter and returned with her to Flanders.

Aert Mijtens painted altarpieces, historical and mythological paintings, and portraits.  He died in Rome.

References

Aert Mijtens on Artnet

External links
 

1540s births
1602 deaths
Flemish Renaissance painters
Artists from Brussels